Fosteria is a monotypic genus of brachiopods belonging to the family Terebratellidae. The only species is Fosteria spinosa.

The species is found in Antarctica.

References

Terebratulida